Lapa do Santo is an archaeological site located in the northern part of the Lagoa Santa karst, in the state of Minas Gerais in east-central Brazil. It documents human presence since ca. 12000 years ago presenting three discrete occupation phases that correspond to the early, middle and late Holocene. Llithic technology, zooarchaeology, and multi-isotopic analyses indicate groups of hunter gathers with low mobility and a subsistence strategy focused on gathering plant foods and hunting small and mid-sized mammals. The use of Lapa do Santo as an interment ground started between 10.3 and 10.6 cal kyBP with primary burials. Between 9.4 and 9.6 cal kyBP central elements in the treatment of the dead were tooth removal, mutilation, defleshing, exposure to fire and possibly cannibalism, all to reduce the body ahead of reburial of the remains while adhering to strict rules. In the absence of monumental architecture or grave goods, these groups were using parts of fresh corpses to elaborate their rituals. As part of this funerary agenda Lapa do Santo presents the oldest case in the New World of decapitation. Another type of burial included pits filled with separated bones of a single individuals presenting abundant evidence of perimortem fracturing. Lapa do Santo also presents a rare instance of securely dated rock art: an early Holocene low relief anthropomorphic figure depicting a phallus.

History of research 
Lagoa Santa is located in east-central Brazil and is well known among archaeologist and paleontologists since the 19th century. The first human skeletons were found by the Danish naturalist Peter Lund between 1835 and 1844 in the Sumidouro cave in association with bones of extinct megafauna. Due to this putative coexistence of humans  and megafauna Lagoa Santa became the focus of many 19th century scholars. During the 20th centuries different teams went to the region pursuing to find evidence that could confirm the coexistence hypothesis. As a result of more than 170 years of excavations a large collection of early Holocene skeletons was formed. However, all those excavation were done in a time when proper documentation was not available and therefore they considerably lack contextual information. Coordinated by Prof. Walter Neves of University of São Paulo and funded by the São Paulo State Grant Foundation (FAPESP) the project “Origins and Microevolution of Man in America: a Paleoanthropological Approach” aimed to overcome this situation by identifying and excavating new sites in Lagoa Santa region. Excavations took place between 2001 and 2009 under the coordination of Renato Kipnis, Astolfo Gomes Melo Araujo and Danilo Bernardo. Starting in 2001 several units were open in distinct areas of the shelter. It became apparent that the densest archaeological deposits were located in the south part of the shelter, immediately in front of the cave's entrance. An ample excavation surface was established in this region becoming the Main Excavation Area (MEA). All human burials were found in the MEA. Excavations of the MEA ended in 2009 when, according to Brazilian laws, the excavated area was filled with sediments recomposing the original topography of the shelter's floor. In 2011, a new excavation area was open in Lapa do Santo as part of another research project. Entitled "The Mortuary Rituals of the First Americans" and coordinated by André Strauss and Rodrigo Elias Oliveira this was a joint venture between the Department of Human Evolution of the Max Planck Institute for Evolutionary Anthropology and the Institute of Biosciences of University of São Paulo.

The rockshelter and the archaeological site
“Lapa” and “Santo” are the Portuguese words for, “rockshelter” and “saint”. Lapa do Santo is a cave with an associated sheltered area of ca. 1300 m2. The southern region of the sheltered area has a relatively flat, height and dry area located immediately in front of the cave's entrance. The floor of the shelter has a strong descending inclination towards the north, which becomes flat again near a natural sinkhole located at the northern extreme of the sheltered area.

A three-dimension coordinate system (x,y,z) was established in Lapa do Santo. The y-axis was conveniently oriented following the longer dimensions of the sheltered area, which is, in turn, roughly aligned with the geographic north–south axis (increasing towards the north). Therefore, the y-axis is also referred to as the north–south or N-S axis. The x-axis is perpendicular to the y-axis and is therefore roughly aligned with geographic east–west (increasing towards east). The x-axis is also referred to as the east–west or E-W axis. X-axis and y-axis define a horizontal plane. The z-axis is perpendicular to the plane defined by x-axis and y-axis and is therefore also referred to as the vertical axis or absolute depth (decreasing with progressive depth). The origin of the coordinate system (i.e. x=0, y=0, y=0) was conveniently positioned outside the sheltered area. An arbitrary grid with squares of 1 meter per side was established starting from the origin of the coordinate system. In the x-axis, each one-meter interval was sequentially labeled with letters (A,B,C,D, etc.) and in the y-axis, each one-meter interval was sequentially labeled with numbers (1, 2, 3, 4, 5, etc.). The excavation of the site followed this grid and the unit's code refers to this system (e.g. L11, B13, Z14).

Physical setting 
Lapa do Santo is located in Lagoa Santa region, eastern central Brazil. Lagoa Santa is an environmentally protected area comprising 360 km2. The vegetation is dominated by savanna (cerrado) and semi-deciduous forest. The rivers Mocambo, Samambaia, Jaguara and Gordura make up a tributary net that flows west to east to Velhas River, the main river in the area. Geomorphologically Lagoa Santa is a karstic terrain that can be divided into four distinct domains: 1) below 660 meters above sea level (masl) the terrain is characterized by a fluvial plain connected with the regional base level (Velhas River); 2) between 660 and 750 masl there is a karstic plain with dolines and lakes 3) between 750 and 850 masl there are karstic plateaus characterized by the presence of limestone outcrops (reaching up to 75 meters in height); 4) above 850 masl residual peaks composed of the non-soluble metasedimentary rocks from the Serra da Santa Helena Formation. The Lagoa Santa region geology comprises Sete Lagoas Formation and Serra da Santa Helena Formation, both part of the Upper Proterozoic metassediments of the Bambuí Group of the São Francisco craton. This cratonic cover metamorphosed during the Brazilian Cycle (700-450 million years ago) in a process that resulted in planar structures, such as lineation and foliation, and sub-vertical structures, such as normal and revert faults. The combination of these structures provides the path for the geomorphologic evolution that leads to the rockshelter configurations found in the region. The regional rockshelters and outcrops are developed in the limestone of the Sete Lagoas Formation. More specifically, Lapa do Santo rockshelter developed in the Member Pedro Leopoldo that is composed by very pure limestones with more than 90% calcite. The annual mean temperature is 23 °C, with lower temperatures (11 °C) occurring between June and July and higher temperatures (35 °C) occurring between October and November. The average humidity is around 65% in the dry season, from May to September, and around 85% on the rainy season, from November to April, with a pluviometrical mean of 1,400 mm/year. The major climatic characteristic of this region is the high concentration of rain during the rainy season (93% of total volume). When evaporation is analyzed, the region presents an annual deficit of 176 mm. Despite these particular variations, the regional climate is classified as tropical, with a rainy summer and dry winter. During dry periods, the above ground water sources can become very scarce although underground drainages are capable of keeping the discharge in Velhas River.

Chronology 

The chronology of the site is based on OSL and radiocarbon dating and it defines three distinct human occupation periods with the oldest one starting at 12.7-11.7 cal kyBP (all chronological ranges are based on a 95.4% interval). If we consider a 95.4% confidence interval Lapa do Santo's Period 1 (LSP-1) starts at 12.7 cal kyBP and ends at 7.9 cal kyBP, Lapa do Santo's Period 2 (LSP-2) starts at 5.4 cal kyBP and ends at 3.9 cal kyBP; Lapa do Santo's Period 3 (LSP-3) starts at 2.1 cal kyBP and ends at 0.0 cal kyBP.  When the three periods are considered there is a very good agreement between vertical position (i.e., z-value) and dated charcoals showing the stratigraphic integrity of the deposits. At Lapa do Santo a total of 63 charcoal samples were selected for radiocarbon dating. Of those 53 were sent to the Beta Analytic AMS system in Miami and 10 to the Oxford Radiocarbon Accelerator Unit. In total 21 sediment samples were collected for luminescence dating, including two outside the shelter in the lake basin. The samples were mainly collected from test unit Q48 in the northern part of the shelter, from a T-shaped trench extending from the northern to southern part of the shelter, and from test units F13 and M6 in the main area of excavation. Analysis were conducted by Prof. James K. Feathers of the University of Washington. According to the OSL samples the earliest human occupation appears to date from about 9.0 to 12.0 kyBP, consistent with other paleoindian occupations in Lagoa Santa. In the unit F13 dates are at least two thousand years older than the dates obtained from radiocarbon.

Formation processes and stratigraphy 

Formation process analysis characterizes Lapa do Santo's deposits as mainly anthropogenic and composed by repeated combustion activities, indicating an intense occupation of the same locality over time. The macro stratigraphy of Lapa do Santo shows an intercalation of layers with diffuse to sharp boundaries that can be divided into three main categories, from the more to the less frequent: 1) tabular, grey, centimetric layers of powdery carbonate sediments, with common sand grains and frequent to common red clay aggregates and charcoal (20-40 %); 2) lenticular, red centimetric layers of indurated clay minerals with rare charcoal fragments; 3) lenticular, black, milimetric and centimetric layers, with high concentration of charcoal and microcharcoal. The ash crystals are described as rhombohedric micro-crystalline calcite crystals (10-30 µm). The crystals develop after burning of the calcium oxalates that naturally appear in the plant cells at temperatures around 400-600 °C. Ash crystals, also described as pseudomorphs of calcium oxalate into calcite (POCC), are the diagnostic micromorphological trait of plant ashes. Ash crystals have an overall good preservation. The clay aggregates are always blocky, angular to sub-rounded. They appear in frequencies from 10 to 70% and show three distinct colors: red, orange and yellow. The differences could be related with the natural Fe2O3 content or to the anthropic modification of the clay aggregates (by human fires), as suggested by the dark red rims. Bioturbation of the sediments is indicated by channel and chamber voids, seen in most of the thin sections, passage features and large faunal channels. However, bioturbation was generally not intense since fragile components, such as tissue residues, laminations of fine plant tissue and articulated ashes show good integrity. The mixing of geogenic (clay aggregates) and anthropogenic sediments (ashes) seen in Lapa do Santo is a frequent characteristic in rockshelters of Lagoa Santa. Ashes from anthropic fires have been described in the sediments of Lapa das Boleiras and Lapa Grande de Taquaraçu.

Diet and subsistence 
Zooarchaeological analysis indicates the presence of fish, lizards, rodents, armadillos, peccaries and deer that were brought as a single piece from the killing site. Results of stable carbon and nitrogen isotopic analysis indicate a diet where protein mainly came from plant food resources. Together with dental caries frequencies comparable to those observed among agricultural populations, the emerging picture is of a typical early Archaic economy structured around staple carbohydrates complemented by hunting of small and mid-sized animals.

Zooarchaeology 
Zooarchaeological analyses are key to better understand the relationship between humans and other animal populations, specifically for studies on diet and hunting strategies. For the faunal analyses at Lapa do Santo A standard zooarchaeological methodology was adopted. The Number of Identified Specimens (NISP) and Minimum Number of Individuals (MNI) was computed for a sample of faunal assemblage coming from units: L7, L8, L10, M3, M4, M5, M6, and from archaeological strata contemporary to the early Holocene human remains. The results point to a faunal assemblage dominated by small and medium-sized mammals, as well as reptiles, birds and fishes. Bigger mammals, such as deer and peccaries are also present in the faunal assemblage, but not as predominantly as one would expect based on their much higher return rate when compared to medium-sized animals; but in accordance with evolutionary ecology models for prehistoric foraging societies in Central Brazil. The fact that almost all the anatomical parts of deer are represented indicates a subsistence/dietary strategy that is not targeting specific body parts when analyzed against Food Utility Index (FUI). The game was not dismembered in the killing site, but brought as entire piece to the dwelling camp.

Carbon and nitrogen stable isotopes 
Carbon and nitrogen stable isotope analysis on bone collagen is widely used in archaeology for reconstructing ancient diets. A total of 17 human bones and 51 faunal bones from the early Holocene deposits of Lapa do Santo were analysed with this technique. Due to poor preservation conditions only eight human from Lapa do Santo and 22 faunal samples from Lagoa Santa provided collagen with an acceptable C:N ratio between 2.9 and 3.6. The material was analyzedin three different laboratories: the Dorothy Garrod Laboratory for Isotopic Analysis of the McDonald Institute for Archaeological Research, University of Cambridge (UC); the Laboratório de Ecologia Isotópica (Isotope Ecology Lab) at the Escola Superior de Agricultura Luis de Queirós, University of São Paulo (ESALQ-USP); and the isotope facilities at the Max-Planck Institute for Evolutionary Anthropology (MPI-EVA).

Results for the fauna are mostly consistent with their dietary habits. Deer (Mazama sp.;Cervidae, Goldfuss 1820) are browsing animals, and in the savannas of central Brazil normally feed on more 13C-depleted gallery forest plants. Their predominantly C3 plant based diet is compatible with the observed collagen isotope values of d13C -20.7±1.6‰ and d15N 6.0±1.9 ‰ (1 sigma interval, n=10). Tayassuidae (Palmer 1897) have generalist omnivore diets. The total of 6 analyzed collagen samples of this animal clustered into two groups of three samples each. One group has a typical C3 type herbivore diet, very similar to that found in deer, averaging d13C -22.5±1.0‰ and d15N 4.7±0.5‰; whilst the other group has a more carnivore-like diet, averaging d13C -16.5±1.0‰ and d15N 9.7±0.3‰. This difference could be due to a number of reasons such as their broad alimentary range, inter-species variation, environmental changes, or the small sample size. Both armadillo species, Dasypus novencinctusand Euphractus sexcinctus (Dasypodidae, Gray 1821) are omnivores with a tendency to carnivory. Both species have collagen isotope values compatible with a carnivorous behavior averaging d13C -14.9±1.7‰, d15N 8.2±0.5‰ (n=3) and d13C -18.4‰, d15N 8.2‰ (n=2), respectively.

The human results are invariant in their d13C values, displaying a mean of d13C -19.0±0.6‰ and, therefore, indicating a predominately C3 based diet. The d15N values range from 5.3 to 11.3‰. The most enriched d15N value comes from an infant with non-erupted permanent dentition and probably reflects breastfeeding. Sub-adults with erupted permanent deciduous already have d15N values more similar to adults. The low d15N values in the adult population is distinct from the carnivores (t=4.50; p=0.001) and similar to the herbivores from Lagoa Santa region (t=0.25; p=0.400), suggesting a diet based on plants and supplemented by fauna. This is consistent with zooarchaeological studies from central Brazil pointing to a generalist diet mostly based on the gathering of plants but supplemented by small game.

Dental pathologies 
Dental pathologies are used as a dietary proxy in bioarchaeological studies. As expected for generalist foragers living in a tropical environment, the elevated frequency of dental abscesses and caries has been reported for early Holocene Lagoa Santa, particularly among females. In an environment with a wide variety of tubers and fruits such as pequi (Caryocar brasiliense), jatobá (Hymenaea sp.) and araticum (Annona crassiflora), it is expected that humans would have had a diverse diet instead of focusing exclusively on meat.

Mobility 
Human enamel strontium isotopic values that are close to the range of the local bioavailable signature are consistent with a subsistence strategy based on immediately available local resources. Low levels of mobility are also supported by previous studies of the femur's midshaft morphology. The abandonment of allochthonous raw material for lithic production after 9.9 cal kyBP could indicate the moment when this less mobile mode of life began.

Hand use 

The trabecular structure of Lapa do Santo hand bones was compared to a large series of human and neanderthal populations. Results are consistent with heavy use of the hand for knapping activities and a variable loading during manipulation.

Technology 
The lithic assemblage is dominated by small flakes and cores. Crystal quartz was by far the dominant raw material, but silex, quartzite and silicified sandstone were also used. There is no clear division between artifact and debitage, and every flake is a potential tool. With the exception of a single hematite blade and an arrow point, formal artifacts are inexistent. The flakes were discarded when their edge became dull and most of them were used only a few times. Feather scars, occasional scaler and snap fractures were identified by preliminary use-wear analysis of flakes from Lapa do Santo indicating they were used to cut soft materials such as hides, meat, cordage and grasses. While lithic types were constant through time, the use of raw material varied and around 9.9 cal kyBP non-local sources such as silexite were no longer exploited with the locally available crystal quartz becoming dominant. The bone artifacts from Lapa do Santo are very similar to what is observed in other parts of central Brazil during the same timeframe. They contrast sharply with the expedient technological approach adopted for the production of lithic artifacts.

Ancestry, genetics and facial reconstruction 
Analysis of morphological affinities shows that Lapa do Santo shares a typical Palaeoamerican cranial morphology with other groups of Lagoa Santa region. Lapa Santo can therefore be characterized as a typical Lagoa Santa group. Similar results were obtained with dental metric data. Mitochondrial DNA was extracted from 11 individuals from Lapa do Santo (A2=5, B2=3, C1d1=1, D4h3a=2).  The presence of the haplogroup D4h3a disproves previous suggestions that this was related to a coastal expansion. Nuclear DNA was extracted from 7 individuals from Lapa do Santo. Four individuals have the Q1a2a Y-chromosome haplogroup and one individual the C2b Y-chromosome haplogroup. The former and later haplogroups are rare and extremely rare in recent Native Americans, respectively. Haplogroup C2b is so rare that it was proposed to represent a post 6000 years arrival to the continent - a hypothesis disproved by the data from Lapa do Santo. Lapa do Santo has one individual with the ancestral allele for the EDAR gene showing that the derived allele EDAR V370A - present in 100% of present-day Native Americans and East Asians - was not yet fixed by the early Holocene, implying convergent evolution on both sides of the Pacific. Genomic analysis of ca. 1.2 million SNPs indicates that the individuals from Lapa do Santo were exclusively related with other Native Americans with an important contribution from Clovis related populations.

Lapa do Santo's facial features can be visualized by a forensic reconstruction made by Prof. Caroline Wilkinson based on a virtually retro-deformed 3D model of the cranium of Burial 26.

Rock art 
Lapa do Santo is also known for presenting an early Holocene low relief rock art record including a pictorial tradition that depicts phallic imagery and birth scenes suggesting the existence of fertility rituals.

The Mortuary Patterns of Lapa do Santo 
The 26 human burials from Lapa do Santo were divided into six different mortuary patterns based on their chronology and shared features.

Lapa do Santo Mortuary Pattern 1 
LSMP-1 is dated to 9.7-10.6 cal kyBP and is characterized by two primary single burials in flexed position (Burials 1 and 27).

Lapa do Santo Mortuary Pattern 2
Lapa do Santo Mortuary Pattern 2 (LSMP-2) is dated to 9.4-9.6 cal kyBP and can be further subdivided into three categories: LSMP-2a (Burial 21 and 26), LSMP-2b (Burials 9, 14, 17, 18 and 23) and LSMP-2c (isolated bones). LSMP-2a is characterized by fully articulated partial skeletons with cutting and chopping marks. In Burial 21, the midshafts of both tibiae and fibulae were chopped and removed while soft tissue was still present. Burial 26 is a severed head with the first six cervical vertebrae articulated in anatomical position. The hyoid bone was missing and both amputated hands were laid over the face. Scanning electron microscopy and confocal microscopy of the cut-marks shows the presence of parallel micro-striations and a V-shaped transversal profile, indicating the use of stone flakes as the cutting agent. In conjunction the evidence show LSMP-2a involved the mutilation of fresh corpses.LSMP-2b is characterized by graves filled with the fully disarticulated bones of up to five individuals presenting a strong selection of anatomical parts. Some bones show evidence of exposure to fire, application of red pigment, defleshing, cutting, chopping and removal of teeth. Burials 14, 17 and 18 were composed of a bundle of long bones from one or two individuals, deposited with the individualized cranium and/or mandible of a different individual. Bundles comprising infant post-cranial bones were found next to adult crania (Burials 14 and 17), and bundles comprising adult post-cranial bones were found next to an infant cranium (Burial 18). The long bones of the bundles had been chopped and segregated into extremities and midshafts and in some cases the latter were further chopped into smaller sections. The cranium of Burial 17 was used as a funerary receptacle and filled with chopped burnt bones some of which present defleshing cut-marks. Black burn marks limited to the anterior portion of the external maxillary alveolar margin indicate exposure to fire while soft tissue was still present. The co-occurrence of chopped and defleshed bones with signs of burning with soft tissues suggests that LSMP-2 may have involved some form of cannibalism. In Burials 17 and 18, all teeth were intentionally removed and the coronoid processes of Burial 18's mandible were drilled. Red pigment was abundantly applied to the bones of Burial 14and Burial 18. Burial 23 was composed of a cranium calotte filled with 54 permanent and 30 deciduous teeth, some of which belonged to the skull of Burial 17. Burial 9 was an individualized child skull placed near the pelvis of an individual of similar age. The deciduous dentition was removed and an assemblage of human teeth and chopped midshafts (accession code: LSt-2253) were deposited next to Burial 9. LSMP-2c is defined by isolated burnt chopped bones that were not part of any formal burial and the presence of rodent gnaw marks could indicate they were subject to scavenging and not immediately buried.

Lapa do Santo Mortuary Pattern 3 
Lapa do Santo Mortuary Pattern 3 (LSMP-3) is dated to 8.2-8.6 cal kyBP and includes nine burials: 6, 7, 10, 11, 12, 13, 15, 19 and 22. Burials are characterized by shallow circular pits completely filled with mostly disarticulated bones of single individuals of various ages and sexes. Circular stone structures covered some of the burials, but also occur independently of them. Anatomical selection was not observed and, with the exception of some small bones, most elements of the skeleton were present. The midshafts of long bones of adult individuals were in some cases intentionally broken in the central region before deposition, resulting in butterfly fractures with impact points indicating the use of some percussion instrument. The burials belonging to LSMP-3 are very similar to each other, contrasting the larger variability observed within LSMP-2. Furthermore, characteristic elements of the latter, such as cut-marks, chop-marks, absence of dentition, red pigment, and burnt marks are not present in the former.

Lapa do Santo Mortuary Pattern 4 
Lapa do Santo Mortuary Pattern 4 (LSMP-4) is defined based on Burial 2 and Burial 3 that were composed of the partial articulated skeleton of a single adult individual with limb bones missing. In Burial 2 (male) the bones of the upper limb were missing and in Burial 3 (female) both the bones of the upper and lower limb were missing. It is not clear if these absences are taphonomic or result from the intentional acts of the funerary agents.

Lapa do Santo Mortuary Pattern 5 
Lapa do Santo Mortuary Pattern 5 (LSMP-5) includes only Burial 5. Burial 5 was a completely disarticulated complete skeleton of a single adult male individual. The bones were part of a bundle and several defleshing marks were observed.

Lapa do Santo Mortuary Pattern 6 
Lapa do Santo Mortuary Pattern 6 (LSMP-6) includes Burial 8, the single total cremation case from Lapa do Santo, something rare also in the Lagoa Santa region as whole. The calcinated bones of a single adult female (?) individual were inside a circular pit. Charcoals were not found in association with the bones.

References 

Archaeological sites in Brazil
History of Minas Gerais
Prehistory of Brazil
Rock art in South America